"FDB" is a song by American rapper Young Dro, released on March 28, 2013, as the lead single from his second studio album High Times (2013). The track, which’s title is an acronym for "Fuck Dat Bitch", was produced by production team FKi. The song peaked at number two on the Billboard Bubbling Under Hot 100 Singles, becoming Young Dro's highest charting song since 2006's "Shoulder Lean".

Background 
On March 28, 2013, "FDB" was released as the lead single from Young Dro's second studio album High Times. Dro explained the song to XXL saying.

Critical reception 
"FDB" was met with generally positive reviews from music critics. XXL named the song one of High Times most enjoyable moments, slso saying, "Under the song's polished and pristine finish, there's a sticky truth, a previously unsung realness blurred by black comedy and raucous punchlines." David Jeffries of AllMusic also praised the song, saying, "tracks like the minimal, mean, and infectious-as-poison-ivy number 'FDB' deserves to be lifted from the mixtape world and put on the turntable of every club."

Music video 
On May 29, 2013 the Phillyflyboy-directed music video for "FDB" premiered on MTV and Vevo. In the comedic video Young Dro plays a fight promoter who is setting up a match-up between two prize fighters. The video also features a cameo appearance by Lil Duval.

Remixes 
On August 26, 2013, the first official remix to "FDB" featuring DJ Drama, French Montana, T.I. and Trinidad James was released. The following day it was released to iTunes. Then on August 28, 2013, a second official remix "FDB" was released featuring B.o.B, Wale and Chief Keef.

Many rappers have also released their remixes and freestyles to the song including, Childish Gambino and 360.

Charts

References

External links
 

2013 singles
Young Dro songs
Grand Hustle Records singles
Atlantic Records singles
2013 songs
MNRK Music Group singles
Hardcore hip hop songs